Prince Zhi of the Second Rank, or simply Prince Zhi, was the title of a princely peerage used in China during the Manchu-led Qing dynasty (1636–1912). As the Prince Zhi peerage was not awarded "iron-cap" status, this meant that each successive bearer of the title would normally start off with a title downgraded by one rank vis-à-vis that held by his predecessor. However, the title would generally not be downgraded to any lower than a feng'en fuguo gong except under special circumstances.

The first bearer of the title was Yunzhi (1672–1735), the eldest son of the Kangxi Emperor. In 1698, Yunzhi was granted the title "Prince Zhi of the Second Rank" by his father. The title was passed down over three generations and held by three persons.

Members of the Prince Zhi peerage
 Yunzhi (1672–1735), the Kangxi Emperor's eldest son, held the title Prince Zhi of the Second Rank from 1698 to 1708, stripped of his title in 1708, given a funeral befitting a beizi in 1735
Hongfang (弘昉; 1704–1772), Yunzhi's second son, held the title of a feng'en zhenguo gong from 1735 to 1772
Yongyang (永揚; 1747–1777), Hongfang's ninth son, held the title of a feng'en fuguo gong in 1773 but was stripped of his title within the same year, had no male heir
 Yongping (永㺸; 1723–1771), Hongfang's son
 Mianliang (綿亮; 1750–1774), Yongping's son
 Yongtuo (永𤣯; 1727–1780), Hongfang's son
 Mianhao (綿灝; 1747–1807), Yongtuo's son
 Yigui (奕貴; 1768–1799), Mianhao's son
 Zaimou (載謀; 1795–1854), Yigui's son
 Puqi (溥麒; 1825–1878), Zaimou's son
 Yubao (毓葆; 1874–?), Puqi's son and Pujia's adopted son
 Hengyuan (恆元; 1911–?), Yubao's son and Yuying's adopted son, held the title of a feng'en jiangjun from 1917
 Pulin (溥麟; 1822–1895), Zaimou's son
 Yuying (毓英; 1870–1915), Pulin's son, held the title of a feng'en jiangjun from 1889 to 1915, had no male heir
 Purui (溥瑞; 1828–1862), Zaimou's son and Yizhang's adopted grandson, held the title of a feng'en jiangjun from 1848 to 1862
 Yuquan (毓荃; 1871–1889), Purui's son, held the title of a feng'en jiangjun from 1862 to 1889
 Mianrong (綿蓉; 1752–1804), Yongtuo's son
 Yixi (奕璽; 1777–1836), Mianrong's son
 Zaima (載禡; 1813–1841), Yixi's son
 Mianbi (綿比; 1762–1823), Yongtuo's son and Yongyang's adopted son
 Yijiang (奕江; 1793–1872), Mianbi's eldest son
 Zaizhen (載振; 1824–1856), Yijiang's son
 Pujia (溥佳; 1845–1876), Zaizhen's eldest son
 Yongmou (永𤣳; 1728–1760), Hongfang's son
 Miannai (綿鼐; 1748–1780), Yong-?'s son
 Hongxiang (弘晌; 1718–1781), Yunzhi's 12th son, held the title of a feng'en jiangjun from 1773 to 1781
 Yongduo (永多; 1740–1809), Hongxiang's eldest son, held the title of a feng'en jiangjun from 1781 to 1809
 Miangen (綿亘; 1761–1803), Yongduo's son
 Yizhang (奕章; 1796–1850), Miangen's eldest son, held the title of a feng'en jiangjun from 1809 to 1848, had no male heir

Family tree

See also
 Prince Fu
 Royal and noble ranks of the Qing dynasty

References 
 

Qing dynasty princely peerages
Peerages of the Bordered Blue Banner